Zygomelon is a genus of sea snails, marine gastropod mollusks in the family Volutidae.

Species
Species within the genus Zygomelon include:

 Zygomelon zodion Harasewych & Marshall, 1995

References

External links

Volutidae
Monotypic gastropod genera